German–Iranian relations are the bilateral relations between Germany and Iran. Official diplomatic relations between Iran and Germany after World War II began in 1939, when Iran opened its first diplomatic mission office in Bonn, both countries′ predecessor states had maintained formal diplomatic relations since the end of 19th century. Germany has an embassy in Tehran, which was originally established in the court of Naser al-Din Shah Qajar in October 1884 and has been in the present building since 1894. Iran opened its embassy in Berlin in 1885. Germany and Iran continued to have political relations well into World War II which severely impacted ethnic minorities like Iranians of Jewish descent negatively. In December 2022, Germany said it was "suspending state incentives to promote trade with Iran due to the repression of demonstrators."

History

Qajar era 
Unofficial relations between the German Reich and Iran date to the early 19th century. Goethe's dedication of his West-östlicher Divan (West-Eastern Divan) to Hafez in 1819 is an illustration of how far back such cultural ties go.

During the Qajar era, with the increasing unpopularity of world powers in Persia such as Russia and United Kingdom, especially after the Treaties of Turkmenchay and Gulistan and the revolt of Grand Ayatollah Mirza Hassan Shirazi in the Tobacco movement, many Iranian intellectuals began searching for a "third force", which could be relied upon as a potential ally: Germany, which had largely remained out of the Great Game.

When Iran's first modern university was first established, Amir Kabir preferred the hiring of Austrian and German professors for Darolfonoon. Even Nasereddin Shah supported the idea of hiring them to serve as Darolfonoon's faculty, despite political pressures towards the contrary. In that regard, it is even written that Amir Kabir always showed interest in discussing the structural system of Germany's government and society as a model for modernizing his country.

During the Constitutionalist movement of Guilan, German soldiers were actively involved in training the popular army of Mirza Kuchak Khan. Mirza's field commander was a German officer by the name Major Von Pashen who had joined the Jangal movement after being released from a British prison in Rasht: he was Mirza's closest ally. Another famous German agent in Iran (especially during World War I) was Wilhelm Wassmuss, nicknamed the "German Lawrence".

Among commercial treaties, one can mention the June 6th, 1873 treaty signed in Berlin between Prince Bismarck and Mirza Hussein Khan.

First Pahlavi era and Nazi Germany 
Iranian Jews were very negatively impacted by this relation. In 1936 head of Reichbank and the financial mastermind of Nazi Germany travelled to Tehran and many important commercial agreements were signed between the two countries. In 1939, Nazi Germany sent over 7500 books with racial tones advocating for greater collaboration between Aryan Persians and Germans. In 1936, Iranians were called pure Aryans and were excluded from the Nuremberg Laws. Iranian railways was constructed by German engineers. Railway companies were specifically ordered to avoid employing any person of Jewish descent in any of its subdivisions. Hitler personally promised that if he defeated the Soviet Union, he would return all of the Persian land taken by Russians during the nineteenth and twentieth centuries. Many gentile anti-Semites were preparing for the Johoudkoshan (Massacre of the Jews) and were warning Jews in the streets to leave Iran while they can. Nazi Germany had nightly broadcasts in Persian and was calling many leading Iranian politicians who had anti-German tendencies "Crypto-jews". Bahram Shahrukh, who was employed by German radio, performed fiery anti-Jewish broadcasts every night. In Purim 1941, Shahrukh promoted the idea of revenge for the massacre of the Purim in biblical times, and suggested his Iranian followers to attack the Jews. Nightly newspapers were distributed in Tehran and swastikas were often painted on Jewish homes and shops. Thus many Persian Jews welcomed the British troops to capture Iran in 1942, since the alternative was to be taken over by Germans.

In order to fight the growing racial antisemitism among the Iranian population, many Jews joined the Tudeh party and advocated for communism. Even though Jews comprised less than 2 percent of the Iranian population, almost fifty percent of the members of the Tudeh party were Jewish. The Tudeh party was the only Iranian political party to accept Jews. Most writers for publications of the party were Jewish. Furthermore, many Iranian Jews viewed communism as a Jewish movement since many leading members of the communist revolution in Russia were Jewish and were looked upon favorably by Persian Jews.

The shelling of Iran's parliament by the Russians and the signing of the 1919 treaty firmly planted the roots of suspicion against Britain and Russia. Many people were aware of Wilhelm II's speech in Damascus in 1898 calling on all Muslims to rely on him as a true friend. By the early 1930s, Reza Shah or the elder Reza Pahlavi's economic ties with Nazi Germany began worrying the Allied states. Germany's modern state and economy highly impressed the Shah, and there were hundreds of Germans involved in every aspect of the state from setting up factories to building roads, railroads and bridges.

In 1936, the Hitler cabinet declared Iranians to be immune to the Nuremberg Laws, as they were considered to be "pure Aryans". Abdol Hossein Sardari, an Iranian junior diplomat, tried to save many Persian Jews from extermination by convincing many Nazi officials to leave them alone. Sardari was stationed in Paris at the time of the Nazi occupation. His efforts led the Nazis to issue a directive that Iranian Jews should be exempt from wearing the yellow star of David. It is said that Sardari gave out between 500 and 1,000 Iranian passports, without the consent of his superiors. His actions are believed to have saved 2,000 to 3,000 Jewish lives, as passports were issued for entire families.

In 1939, Germany provided Iran with the so-called German Scientific Library. The library contained over 7500 books selected "to convince Iranian readers... of the kinship between the National Socialist Reich and the Aryan culture of Iran". In various pro-Nazi publications, lectures, speeches, and ceremonies, parallels were drawn between the Shah and Hitler, and praises were given to the charisma and the virtue of the Führerprinzip.

For many decades, Iran and Germany had cultivated ties, partly as a counter to the imperial ambitions of Britain and Russian (later the Soviet Union). Trading with the Germans appealed to Iran because they did not have a history of imperialism in the region, unlike the British and the Russians.

From 1939 to 1941, Iran's top foreign trade partner (nearly 50% of its total trade) was Germany, which helped Iran in opening modern sea and air communications with the rest of the world.

Demands from the Allies for the expulsion of German residents in Iran, mostly workers and diplomats, were refused by the Shah. A British embassy report in 1940, estimated that there were almost 1,000 German nationals in Iran. According to Iran's Ettelaat newspaper, there were actually 690 German nationals in Iran (out of a total of 4,630 foreigners, including 2,590 British). Jean Beaumont estimates that "probably no more than 3,000" Germans actually lived in Iran, but they were believed to have a disproportionate influence because of their employment in strategic government industries and Iran's transport and communications network".

However, the Iranians also began to reduce their trade with the Germans under Allied demands. Reza Shah sought to remain neutral and to anger neither side, which was becoming increasingly difficult with the British and Soviet demands on Iran. Many British forces were already present in Iraq as a result of the Anglo-Iraqi War earlier in 1941. Thus, British troops were stationed on the western border of Iran prior to the invasion.

In 1941, the Allies forced Reza Shah to abdicate the throne to his son, Mohammad Reza Pahlavi. His followers, who refused the British occupation of Iran, such as Fazlollah Zahedi and Mohammad Hosein Airom ,shared similar fates. The British believed that Zahedi was planning a general uprising in co-operation with German forces. He was arrested and found with German weapons and correspondence from a German agent. He was flown out of the country and interned in Palestine.

Second Pahlavi era
Postwar Iran came under the inescapable diplomatic shadow of the United States, which reduced the chances of further deepening relations between Tehran and Bonn. In commercial links, West Germany still remained well ahead of other European countries, even the United States, until 1974.

In 1972, after the visit to Tehran of West German Chancellor Willy Brandt, Iran and West Germany signed an economic agreement to provide for Iranian exports of oil and natural gas to Germany, with West German exports to and investments in Iran in return. However, given its huge surplus in foreign trade in 1974 and 1975, the Iranian government bought 25% of the shares of Krupp Hüttenwerke (German for smelting plants), the steel subsidiary of the German conglomerate Krupp, in September 1974. That provided the much needed cash injection to Krupp, it also gave Iran access to German expertise to expand its steel industry. Iran's Bushehr nuclear power plant was also designed and partially built by the German Kraftwerk Union of Siemens, meanwhile, an agreement that was inked. Along with the agreement, a letter of intent was also signed on November 10 by which the West German firm would construct four new 1,200-megawatt nuclear power stations in Iran over the next ten years. The letter was signed by the Atomic Energy Organization of Iran and a director of Siemens on behalf of Kraftwerk Union. The four new plants were to be built in pairs, two in Isfahan and two in the Markazi Province, probably near Saveh. Target date for the first plant to go on stream was 1984, with another plant expected to become operational in each of the following three years. Kraftwerk Union was already building two similar-sized nuclear power stations near Bushehr on the Persian Gulf, while a French consortium headed by the Creusot-Loire subsidiary Framatome was building two 900-megawatt nuclear plants along the Karun River south of Ahvaz.

In 1975, West Germany became the second supplier of non-military goods to Iran. Valued at $404 million, West German imports amounted to nearly one fifth of total Iranian imports.

As the European country with the largest Iranian expatriate community, West Germany had the Shah's visits become the focus of much protest in the 1970s. As repression in Iran became more intense, the demonstrations became more vigorous. Many of Iran's intellectual ayatollahs, such as Ayatollah Beheshti actually spent some years in cities like Hamburg.

Since Iranian Revolution 

Hans-Dietrich Genscher was the first Western foreign minister to visit Iran after the Islamic Revolution in 1979, visiting Iran in 1984.

Although West Germany was a key technology supplier to Saddam Hussein during the Iran–Iraq War, especially to Saddam's chemical weapons program, Germany also kept open relations with Iran in some industrial and civilian technological sectors.

After the war, Germany increasingly became a primary trading partner of Iran, with German goods worth about 3.6 billion euros being imported into Iran in 2004.

The 1992 Mykonos restaurant assassinations and Mykonos Trial in Berlin severely soured relations. On September 17, 1992, Kurdish Iranian insurgent leaders Sadegh Sharafkandi, Fattah Abdoli, Homayoun Ardalan and their translator Nouri Dehkordi were assassinated at the Mykonos Greek restaurant, in Berlin, Germany. In the Mykonos trial, the courts found Kazem Darabi, an Iranian national, who worked as a grocer in Berlin, and the Lebanese Abbas Rhayel, guilty of murder and sentenced them to life in prison. Two other Lebanese, Youssef Amin and Mohamed Atris, were convicted of being accessories to murder. In its 10 April 1997 ruling, the court issued an international arrest warrant for Iranian intelligence minister Hojjat al-Islam Ali Fallahian after it declared that the assassination had been ordered by him with knowledge of Supreme Leader Ali Khamenei and President Ayatollah Rafsanjani.

In a 2004 letter to Berlin Mayor Klaus Wowereit, Mahmoud Ahmadinejad, the then mayor of Tehran, objected to the commemorative plaque in front of the restaurant and called it an insult to Iran.

In 1999, a German, Helmut Hofer, was arrested in Tehran after he had an affair with an Iranian woman. That caused some tremors in the domestic political landscape and the diplomatic relations of Tehran-Berlin.

That was followed in 2005, when a German angler on vacation in the United Arab Emirates was arrested in the Persian Gulf and convicted to a prison sentence of 18 months. In 2009 a German lawyer, Andreas Moser, was arrested during the protests against the 2009 elections but was released after one week. Also in 2005, the hardline Iranian President Mahmoud Ahmadinejad stirred relations with comments directed against the Jewish Holocaust. However, Tehran's tensions with Germany and most of the rest of Europe have eased considerably in recent years after the election of the more moderate Hassan Rouhani as president in 2013.

2000s to 2010s 

On 4 February 2006, the day that the International Atomic Energy Agency Board of Governors voted to refer ("report") Iran's case to the United Nations Security Council, German Chancellor Angela Merkel told the annual Munich Conference on Security Policy that the world must act to stop Iran from developing a nuclear bomb. With Germany having been one of the three European Union countries that had negotiated with Iran for two-and-a-half years in a bid to persuade Iran to stop its uranium enrichment program, Merkel said that Iran was a threat to both Europe and Israel.

In July 2015, Germany was the only non-UNSC nation that signed, along with the five UN Security Council's five permanent members, the Joint Comprehensive Plan of Action (JCPOA) with Iran, an agreement on the Iranian nuclear program. Following the U.S. withdrawal from the JCPOA in May 2018, Germany, along with the two other EU state signatories to the JCPOA (E3), issued a joint statement, which said, "It is with regret and concern that we, the Leaders of France, Germany and the United Kingdom take note of President Trump’s decision to withdraw the United States of America from the Joint Comprehensive Plan of Action. Together, we emphasise our continuing commitment to the JCPoA. This agreement remains important for our shared security"

2020s 
In January 2020, Germany was among the E3 states that jointly formally informed the EU that they had registered their "concerns that Iran [was] not meeting its commitments under the JCPoA" and thereby triggered the dispute resolution mechanism under the JCPOA, a move that they said had "the overarching objective of preserving the JCPoA". The move was thought to be aimed at pushing the sides back to the negotiating table.

In September 2020, in the first coordinated move by the three countries, Germany, France and the UK summoned Iranian ambassadors in a joint diplomatic protest against Iran's detention of dual nationals and its treatment of political prisoners. In December 2020, Iran's Foreign Ministry summoned the envoys from France and from Germany, which held the EU rotating presidency, to protest French and EU criticism of the execution of the journalist Ruhollah Zam.

On 3 November 2022, amid severe crackdown on ongoing protests by the Iranian government, the German government urged German citizens (concerning, "above all", dual German-Iranian citizens) to leave Iran, upon reported risks of arbitrary detentions and long prison terms. In November, the German parliament passed a comprehensive package of measures against the Islamic Republic following a session on the current situation in Iran, intended to increase pressure on the regime in Tehran.

In response to Iran sentencing German national Jamshid Sharmahd to death in February 2023, Germany summoned Iran's chargé d'affaires, declared two employees of the Iranian embassy personae non gratae and ordered them to leave the country. Annalena Baerbock said that Germany would "not accept this massive breach of a German citizen's rights." In retaliation, Iran on declared two German diplomats as personae non gratae and ordered them to leave the country, accusing Germany of interfering in its judicial affairs.

Trade

Around 50 German firms have their own branch offices in Iran, and more than 12,000 firms have their own trade representatives in Iran. Several renowned German companies are involved in major Iranian infrastructure projects,l especially in the petrochemical sector, like Linde, BASF, Lurgi, Krupp, Siemens, ZF Friedrichshafen, Mercedes, Volkswagen and MAN (2008).

In 2005, Germany had the largest share of Iran's export market with $5.67 billion (14.4%). In 2008, German exports to Iran increased 8.9% and were 84.7% of the total German-Iranian trade volume.

The overall bilateral trade volume until the end of September 2008 stood at 3.23 billion euros, compared to 2.98 billion euros the previous year. The value of trade between Tehran and Berlin has increased from around 4.3 billion euro in 2009 to nearly 4.7 billion euro in 2010. According to German sources, around 80% of machinery and equipment in Iran is of German origin.

The German Chambers of Industry and Commerce (DIHK) has estimated that economic sanctions against Iran may cost more than 10,000 German jobs and have a negative impact on the economic growth of Germany. Sanctions would hurt especially medium-sized German companies, which depend heavily on trade with Iran.

There has been a shift in German business ties with Iran from long-term business to short-term and from large to mid-sized companies that have fewer business interests in the US and thus are less prone to American political pressure. Around 100 German companies have branches in Iran and more than 1000 businesses work through sales agents, according to the German-Iranian Chamber of Industry and Commerce.

After the official agreement between Iran and the West during the Iran nuclear deal, Germany's economic relations with Iran has been increasing once more. German exports to Iran grew more than 27% from 2015 to 2016.

On 20 October 2018, the Association of German Banks stated that exports from Germany to Iran have reduced to 1.8 billion euros since January.

See also 
 Foreign relations of Germany
 Foreign relations of Iran
 German Embassy School Tehran
 Iranians in Germany
 Bernd Erbel
 Iran–EU relations

References

External links

 , by Oliver Bast
 , by Oliver Bast
 Iranian.com article
 Another informational link
 A chance to improve Germany-Iran relations Tehran Times article (2010)

 
Bilateral relations of Iran
Iran